Blackburn United Football Club are a Scottish football club from the town of Blackburn, West Lothian. The team plays at Tier 6 of the Scottish Football Pyramid in the  having moved from the junior leagues in 2018. Blackburn United became full members of the Scottish Football Association in June 2019.

History
Formed in 1978, the club joined the junior grade of football two years later before taking the step up into Senior football in 2018. United play their home matches at the purpose built Purdie Worldwide Community Stadium (New Murrayfield Park), which has room for 1,100 spectators, in the centre of the town. The whole facility that is the Purdie Worldwide Community Stadium complex boasts a six-dressing room pavilion and associated amenities, an enclosed and floodlit 3G main Stadium pitch and three further 11-a-side pitches.

The club was one of many to move from junior football to the East of Scotland Football League in 2018.

Community Club
The Club forms the pinnacle of the Blackburn United Community Sports Club, a fully accredited SFA Community Club and Scottish Charitable Incorporated Organisation which, in addition to adult semi-professional football, caters for under age football at all ages from under-9 to under-20 as well as ladies, girls and additional needs football and a variety of other sporting activities. For younger age groups there is a soccer school with its own dedicated coaches.

Current squad
As of 14 November 2020

Club staff

Board of directors

Coaching staff

Source

Managerial history

Club records

Appearances
The club's record appearance holder until March 2014 was Craig Spence who, after signing from Airdrieonians  at the beginning of the 1998–99 season, made 375 appearances and scored 20 goals before retiring in August 2012. On 15 March 2014, fellow Airdrie man Alan Brown, signed as a teenager at the beginning of the 1997–98 season and who had three spells at the club, surpassed Spence's record when making his 376th appearance for the club, scoring his 68th goal in the process. Alan went onto make a total of 409 appearances, scoring 69 goals, before leaving the club at the end of the 2014/15 season.

Goals
The club's record goalscorer is Andy McQuillan who, at the beginning of season 2019–20, had netted 173 goals in 235 starts and 24 substitute appearances.

Notable former players
The following players have either played for Blackburn United before going onto forge careers at a higher level or have played for one of the club's predecessors before similarly going onto play at a higher level;

Alan Irvine former Liverpool and Dundee United player.
Chris Innes former Dundee United, Kilmarnock, St Mirren and Inverness Caledonian Thistle player who also captained Gretna to the 2006 Scottish Cup Final.
Tommy Farr former Bradford Park Avenue player. Tommy was the goalkeeper for United's predecessors Blackburn Athletic when they won the 1934 Midlothian League Championship.
Jimmy Stein former Everton player. Jimmy played for another of United's predecessors Blackburn Rovers in 1924 and was a winger who scored Everton's first-ever goal at Wembley when netting in the 1933 FA Cup Final.

References

External links
Official club site
Historical club website
Blackburn United Community Sports Club
New Murrayfield Park
Old Murrayfield Park

 
Football clubs in Scotland
Scottish Junior Football Association clubs
Football in West Lothian
Association football clubs established in 1978
1978 establishments in Scotland
East of Scotland Football League teams